Larry Fleisher (born 1935) is a Canadian football player who played for the Winnipeg Blue Bombers and Edmonton Eskimos. He previously played football at Wake Forest University. Fleisher later served as a city councillor for Winnipeg City Council.

References

1930s births
Living people
Edmonton Elks players
Players of Canadian football from Manitoba
Canadian football people from Winnipeg
Winnipeg city councillors